An academy of sciences is a type of learned society or academy (as special scientific institution) dedicated to sciences that may or may not be state funded. Some state funded academies are tuned into national or royal (in case of the United Kingdom i.e. Royal Society of London for Improving Natural Knowledge) as a form of honor. 

The other type of academies are Academy of Arts or combination of both (e.g., American Academy of Arts and Sciences).
Academy of Letters is another related expression, encompassing literature.
In non-English-speaking countries, the range of academic fields of the members of a national Academy of Science often includes scholarly disciplines which would not normally be classed as "science" in English. Many languages use a broad term for systematized learning which includes both natural sciences and social sciences and fields such as literary studies, linguistics, history, or art history. (Often these terms are calques from Latin scientia (the etymological source of English science) and, accordingly, derivatives of the verb 'know', such as German Wissenschaft, Swedish vetenskap, Hungarian tudomány, Estonian teadus or Finnish tiede.) Accordingly, for example the Austrian Academy of Sciences (Österreichische Akademie der Wissenschaften), the Hungarian Academy of Sciences (Magyar Tudományos Akadémia), or the Estonian Academy of Sciences (Eesti Teaduste Akadeemia) also cover the areas of social sciences and humanities.
 
As the engineering sciences have become more varied and advanced, there is a recent trend in many advanced countries to organize the National Academy of Engineering (or National Academy of Engineering Sciences), separate from the national academy of sciences.   

Academies of science play an important role in science diplomacy efforts.
Academies are increasingly organized in regional or even international associations. The Interacademy Partnership for example is a global network consisting of over 140 national, regional and global member academies of science, engineering and medicine. Additionally, there are many regional associations such as ALLEA in Europe, NASAC as the Network of African Science Academies, IANAS in Latin America, and AASSA in Asia. 

Apart from national academies of science, there are now increasingly also national young academies. National young academies usually select members for a limited term, normally 4–5 years, after which members become academy alumni. Young academies typically engage with issues important to young scientists. These include, for example, science education or the dialog between science and society. Most young academies are affiliated with a senior Academy of Sciences or with a network of senior academies. The Global Young Academy, which itself is a science academy (e.g. full member of Interacademy Partnership) often serves as a facilitator of the growing global network of young academies. Since its creation, more than 35 national young academies have been established. In 2019, there were 41 national young academies.

List

 Afghanistan – Academy of Sciences of Afghanistan
 Albania – Academy of Sciences of Albania
 Argentina – National Academy of Sciences of Argentina
 Armenia – National Academy of Sciences of Armenia
 Austria – Austrian Academy of Sciences
 Australia – Australian Academy of Science
 Azerbaijan – National Academy of Sciences of Azerbaijan
 Bangladesh – Bangladesh Academy of Sciences
 Belarus – National Academy of Sciences of Belarus
 Belgium – Royal Academies for Science and the Arts of Belgium
 Brazil
 Brazilian Academy of Sciences
 Pernambuoc Academy of Science
 Bulgaria – Bulgarian Academy of Sciences
 Canada
 Royal Society of Canada
 Canadian Academy of Engineering
 Chile – Academia Chilena de Ciencias
 China
 Chinese Academy of Sciences
 Chinese Academy of Engineering
 Chinese Academy of Social Sciences
 Hong Kong Academy of Sciences
 Costa Rica – Academia Nacional de Ciencias (Costa Rica)
 Croatia – Croatian Academy of Sciences and Arts
 Czech Republic – Czech Academy of Sciences
 Denmark – Royal Danish Academy of Sciences and Letters
 Estonia – Estonian Academy of Sciences
 Finland
 Finnish Society of Sciences and Letters
 Finnish Academy of Science and Letters 
 France – French Academy of Sciences
 Georgia
 Georgian National Academy of Sciences
 Abkhazian Regional Academy of Sciences
 Germany
 German National Academy of Sciences Leopoldina
 Union of Regional German Academies of Sciences and Humanities:
 Akademie der Wissenschaften und der Literatur
 Academy of Sciences and Humanities in Hamburg
 Bavarian Academy of Sciences and Humanities
 Berlin-Brandenburg Academy of Sciences and Humanities
 Göttingen Academy of Sciences and Humanities
 Heidelberg Academy for Sciences and Humanities
 North Rhine-Westphalian Academy of Sciences, Humanities and the Arts
 Saxon Academy of Sciences and Humanities
 acatech
 Ghana – Ghana Academy of Arts and Sciences
 Greece –  Academy of Athens
 Hungary – Hungarian Academy of Sciences
 India
 Indian Academy of Sciences
 Indian National Science Academy
 National Academy of Sciences, India
 Indonesia
 Indonesian Institute of Sciences
 Indonesian Academy of Sciences
 Iran – Academy of Sciences of Iran
 Italy 
 Lincean Academy
 Accademia Nazionale delle Scienze (detta dei XL)
 Accademia Nazionale Virgiliana di Scienze Lettere ed Arti
 Accademia delle Scienze dell'Umbria
 Israel – Israel Academy of Sciences and Humanities
 Japan 
 Science Council of Japan
 Japan Academy
 Kazakhstan – National Academy of Sciences of the Republic of Kazakhstan
 Kyrgyzstan – National Academy of Sciences of the Kyrgyz Republic
 Latvia – Latvian Academy of Sciences
 Lebanon – Lebanese Academy of Sciences 
 Liechtenstein - Naturwissenschaftliches Forum
 Lithuania – Lithuanian Academy of Sciences 
 Mexico – Mexican Academy of Sciences
 Moldova – Academy of Sciences of Moldova
 Mongolia – Mongolian Academy of Sciences
 Montenegro
 Montenegrin Academy of Sciences and Arts
 Doclean Academy of Sciences and Arts
 Morocco – Hassan II Academy of Sciences and Technologies
 Netherlands – Royal Netherlands Academy of Sciences
 New Zealand – Royal Society of New Zealand
 Nigeria – Nigerian Academy of Science
 North Korea – Academy of Sciences of the Democratic People's Republic of Korea
 North Macedonia – Macedonian Academy of Sciences and Arts
 Norway
 Norwegian Academy of Science and Letters
 Royal Norwegian Society of Science and Letters
 Norwegian Academy of Technological Sciences
 Pakistan – Pakistan Academy of Sciences
 Philippines - National Academy of Science and Technology
 Poland
 Polish Academy of Sciences
 Polish Academy of Learning
 Portugal – Lisbon Academy of Sciences
 Romania – Romanian Academy
 Russia – Russian Academy of Sciences
 San Marino – International Academy of Sciences San Marino 
 Serbia – Serbian Academy of Sciences and Arts
 Singapore – Singapore National Academy of Science
 Slovakia – Slovak Academy of Sciences
 Slovenia – Slovenian Academy of Sciences and Arts
 South Africa - Academy of Science of South Africa
 South Korea – National Academy of Sciences, Republic of Korea
 Soviet Union – Soviet Academy of Sciences
 Spain – Spanish Royal Academy of Sciences
 Sri Lanka – National Academy of Sciences of Sri Lanka
 Sweden – Royal Swedish Academy of Sciences
 Switzerland – Swiss Academies of Arts and Sciences
 Taiwan – Academia Sinica
 Thailand 
 Royal Institute of Thailand
 Thai Academy of Science and Technology
 Turkey
 Turkish Academy of Sciences
 Mesopotamian Academy /Beyt Nahrin Mesopotamian Academy of Arts and Sciences
 Ukraine – National Academy of Sciences of Ukraine
 United Kingdom
 Royal Society
 Royal Academy of Engineering
 Academy of Medical Sciences
 Scotland – Royal Society of Edinburgh
 United States 
 National Academies
 U.S. National Academy of Sciences
 U.S. National Academy of Engineering
 U.S. National Academy of Medicine formerly the Institute of Medicine
 National Research Council
 American Academy of Arts and Sciences
 State-specific
 California – California Academy of Sciences
 Illinois – Illinois State Academy of Science 
 Mississippi – Mississippi Academy of Sciences
 Missouri – Academy of Science, St. Louis
 New York – New York Academy of Sciences
 Pennsylvania - Pennsylvania Academy of Science
 Texas – Texas Academy of Sciences
 Wisconsin – Wisconsin Academy of Sciences, Arts, & Letters  
 Vatican City – Pontifical Academy of Sciences
 Jordan and the Islamic world – Islamic World Academy of Sciences (IAS)
 Developing world – TWAS
 ASEAN – ASEAN Academy of Engineering and Technology
 Academy – World Academy of Art and Science

See also 

 National academy

References